Carlos Alfredo de Brito, GCIH (born Portuguese Mozambique, February 9, 1933) is a Portuguese politician. He was born in Portuguese Mozambique but went with his family to Alcoutim, in Algarve, Portugal when he was 3 years old. He joined the illegal Portuguese Communist Party (PCP) during the corporatist, authoritarian New State regime (1932-1974), by whom he was imprisoned.

In the presidential election of 1980, Brito was the Communist Party candidate, but withdrew shortly before the elections in support of the incumbent President, General António Ramalho Eanes, who was facing a stiff challenge from the right-wing António Soares Carneiro. He served in the Assembly of the Republic until 1991.

He later became a reform member of the PCP, and was suspended due to his criticism, being spared from expulsion in view of his many and historical services to the party. He supported Manuel Alegre, the independent Socialist candidate, in the presidential elections of 2006.

He married the notable former PCP militant Zita Seabra and had two daughters: Ana and Rita de Seabra Roseiro de Brito.

References

1933 births
Living people
Members of the Assembly of the Republic (Portugal)
Portuguese anti-fascists
Portuguese Communist Party politicians
Candidates for President of Portugal
Portuguese prisoners and detainees
Prisoners and detainees of Portugal